Minson is a surname. Notable people with the surname include:

Artie Minson, American businessman, co-CEO of WeWork
John Minson (1927–2017), Australian radio personality 
Lawrie Minson (born 1958), Australian guitarist
Roland Minson (1929–2020), American basketball player
Shelley Minson (born 1970), Australian entertainer
Sofia Minson (born 1984), New Zealand oil painter
Tony Minson (born 1944), English virologist
Will Minson (born 1985), Australian football player